Karamat in Sunni Islam refers to supernatural wonders performed by Muslim saints. 

Karamat or Keramat (Arabic: کرامات, karāmāt, plural of کرامة, karāmah, 'generosity' or 'high-mindedness') may also refer to:

People

Karamat
Karamat Ali (born 1996), Pakistani cricketer
Karamat Ali Jaunpuri (1800-1873), Islamic scholar
Karamat Rahman Niazi, Pakistani admiral
Jehangir Karamat (born 1941), Pakistani general and diplomat

Keramat
Kazi Keramat Ali (born 1954), former Deputy Minister of Technical and Madrasah Education in Bangladesh
Md. Keramat Ali (1901–1969), Bengali politician
Mohammad Keramat Ali (1926–2004), Bangladeshi politician
Keramat Daneshian (1944–1974), Iranian director, poet and communist activist
Keramat Moula (born 1942), Bangladeshi theater activist and art director
Keramat Ali Talukdar, Bangladeshi politician

Places
Keramat, Sulawesi, Indonesia
Keramat (state constituency), Malaysia (1986–1995)
Kampung Datuk Keramat, commonly Keramat, a zone in Titiwangsa constituency, Kuala Lumpur, Malaysia
Lembah Keramat, Selangor, Malaysia
Taman Keramat, Ulu Klang, Selangor, Malaysia

Other uses
Keramat, in Malay language, and kramat in South Africa, a mazar (mausoleum)

See also

Karamah (disambiguation)
Karameh (disambiguation)
Karam (disambiguation)
Karami, a surname
Qarmatians